In Greek mythology, the name Ilioneus (Ancient Greek: Ἰλιονεύς Īlioneus) may refer to:

 Ilioneus, one of the Niobids.
 Ilioneus, a Trojan, an only son of Phorbas, was killed by Peneleos.
 Ilioneus, a Trojan elder, who implored Diomedes to spare him, but was killed nevertheless.
 Ilioneus, a companion of Aeneas. He was one of those whose ships sank during the storm in which Aeneas and his people were caught. Being the eldest of the Trojan survivors with Aeneas, he was the first to speak to Dido when they entered her palace at Carthage.

See also 
 5130 Ilioneus, Jovian asteroid

Notes

References 

 Homer, The Iliad with an English Translation by A.T. Murray, Ph.D. in two volumes. Cambridge, MA., Harvard University Press; London, William Heinemann, Ltd. 1924. . Online version at the Perseus Digital Library.
 Homer, Homeri Opera in five volumes. Oxford, Oxford University Press. 1920. . Greek text available at the Perseus Digital Library.
 Publius Ovidius Naso, Metamorphoses translated by Brookes More (1859-1942). Boston, Cornhill Publishing Co. 1922. Online version at the Perseus Digital Library.
 Publius Ovidius Naso, Metamorphoses. Hugo Magnus. Gotha (Germany). Friedr. Andr. Perthes. 1892. Latin text available at the Perseus Digital Library.
 Quintus Smyrnaeus, The Fall of Troy translated by Way. A. S. Loeb Classical Library Volume 19. London: William Heinemann, 1913. Online version at theio.com
 Quintus Smyrnaeus, The Fall of Troy. Arthur S. Way. London: William Heinemann; New York: G.P. Putnam's Sons. 1913. Greek text available at the Perseus Digital Library.
 Publius Vergilius Maro, Aeneid. Theodore C. Williams. trans. Boston. Houghton Mifflin Co. 1910. Online version at the Perseus Digital Library.
 Publius Vergilius Maro, Bucolics, Aeneid, and Georgics. J. B. Greenough. Boston. Ginn & Co. 1900. Latin text available at the Perseus Digital Library.

Trojans
People of the Trojan War
Characters in the Aeneid